These are the Australian Country number-one albums of 2009, per the ARIA Charts.

See also
 2009 in music
 List of number-one albums of 2009 (Australia)

References

2009
Australia country albums
Number-one Country albums